Macaroni is a kind of pasta.

Macaroni may also refer to:

 Macaroni (fashion), also spelled maccaroni, an 18th-century English fashion trend
 Macaroni (film), a 1985 film directed by Ettore Scola, starring Jack Lemmon and Marcello Mastroianni
 Macaroni (horse) (1860–1887), winner of the 1863 Epsom Derby
 Macaroni penguin, a species of penguin found in the Southern Hemisphere
 Macaronic language, texts written in a mixture of languages

See also
 
 Macarani, a municipality in Brazil
 Macaron, a meringue-based dessert
 Macaroon, a type of cake or cookie made with ground nuts